Lowell-Dracut-Tyngsboro State Forest is a publicly owned forest with recreational features measuring  that overlap the City of Lowell, and the towns of Dracut and Tyngsborough, Massachusetts.

History
The area that makes up the state forest originally belonged to the Mohawk, Huron, and Wowenocks Native Americans. It was later colonized by western settlers before becoming the Pawtucket Falls Indian Reservation. In 1941, Thomas Varnum sold several hundred acres of Hawk Valley Farm to the state for the creation of Lowell-Dracut State Forest.

Activities and amenities
The forest offers fishing and restricted hunting in addition to six miles of trails used for hiking, mountains biking, horseback riding, cross-country skiing, and snowmobiling. Motorized vehicles are restricted to seasonal snowmobiles. Park access points are found at Trotting Park Road, Gumpus Road, Totman Road, Fellows Lane, and Althea Avenue.

References

External links
Lowell-Dracut-Tyngsboro State Forest Department of Conservation and Recreation
Lowell-Dracut-Tyngsboro State Forest Trail Map Department of Conservation and Recreation

Massachusetts state forests
Parks in Middlesex County, Massachusetts
Parks in Lowell, Massachusetts
Protected areas established in 1910
1910 establishments in Massachusetts